The Crystal Lake is an unincorporated community and lake community in Washington County, Florida, United States. It is located just north above the county line. The main roads through the community are State Road 77.

Unincorporated communities in Washington County, Florida
Unincorporated communities in Florida